Shponka and His Aunt is an opera in one act by composer Anastasia Bespalova. The opera uses a Russian libretto by Arkady Zastyrets which is based upon the story of the same name by Nikolai Gogol. The opera was commissioned by the Mariinsky Theatre along with two other new operas, Svetlana Nesterova's The Lawsuit and Vyacheslav Kruglik's The Carriage, all based on stories by Gogol. The three operas premiered together on 21 June 2009 during the Mariinsky Theatre's summer festival.

Roles

References

External links
Shponka and His Aunt playbill, Mariinsky Theatre

Operas
Russian-language operas
2009 operas
One-act operas
Operas based on works by Nikolai Gogol
Operas by Anastasia Bespalova